Everything I Love is the sixth studio album by American country music artist Alan Jackson. It was released on October 29, 1996, and produced six singles for Jackson on the Hot Country Songs charts: the Number One hits "Little Bitty" and "There Goes", Top Ten hits in the title track, "Between the Devil and Me", and "Who's Cheatin' Who" (a cover of Charly McClain's #1 song from 1980), and the #18 "A House with No Curtains", his first single since 1989's "Blue Blooded Woman" to miss the Top Ten. It is the only album of Jackson's career to produce six singles.

Track listing

Chart performance
Everything I Love peaked at #12 on the U.S. Billboard 200, and peaked at #1 on the Top Country Albums, his third #1 Country album. In August 2001, Everything I Love was certified 3 x platinum by the RIAA.

Charts

Weekly charts

Year-end charts

Sales and Certifications

Personnel
As listed in liner notes.

 Eddie Bayers − drums
 Ernie Collins − tuba and horn arrangement on "Must've Had A Ball"
 J. T. Corenflos − electric guitar
 Stuart Duncan − fiddle, mandolin
 Larry Franklin − fiddle
 Paul Franklin − steel guitar
 Barry Green − trombone on "Must've Had a Ball"
 Roy Huskey Jr. − upright bass
 Brent Mason − six-string bass guitar, electric guitar
 Dave Pomeroy − tic tac bass
 Gary Prim – piano
 Hargus "Pig" Robbins – piano
 John Wesley Ryles – backing vocals
 Dennis Sollee – clarinet on "Must've Had a Ball"
 Joe Spivey – fiddle
 Keith Stegall – banjo on "Must've Had a Ball"
 George Tidwell – trumpet on "Must've Had a Ball"
 Wayne Toups – accordion
 Bruce Watkins – acoustic guitar
 Lonnie Wilson – drums
 Glenn Worf – bass guitar

References

1996 albums
Alan Jackson albums
Arista Records albums
Albums produced by Keith Stegall